The following is a list of notable deaths in August 2013.

Entries for each day are listed alphabetically by surname. A typical entry lists information in the following sequence:
 Name, age, country of citizenship and reason for notability, established cause of death, reference.

August 2013

1

 John Amis, 91, British broadcaster, classical music critic and writer.
 John Blumsky, 84, New Zealand broadcaster and journalist.
 Chua Boon Huat, 33, Malaysian Olympic field hockey player, traffic collision.
 John Dengate, 74, Australian folk singer and songwriter.
 Arthur J. England Jr., 80, American judge, member of the Florida Supreme Court (1975–1981).
 Mike Hinton, 57, American guitarist, cancer.
 Dick Kazmaier, 82, American football player and businessman, winner of the Heisman Trophy (1951), heart and lung disease.
 Gail Kobe, 81, American actress (Peyton Place, Gunsmoke) and producer (The Bold and the Beautiful).
Bob Livingstone, 91, American football player.
 Ritham Madubun, 42, Indonesian footballer, stroke.
 Babe Martin, 93, American baseball player (St. Louis Browns).
 Colin McAdam, 61, Scottish footballer (Dumbarton).
 Tomasz Nowak, 52, Polish Olympic boxer.
 P. V. Ranga Rao, 73, Indian politician, heart disease.
 Toby Saks, 71, American cellist, founder of the Seattle Chamber Music Society, pancreatic cancer.
 Wilford White, 84, American football player (Chicago Bears, Toronto Argonauts), natural causes.

2

 Patricia Anthony, 66, American science fiction author.
 Julius L. Chambers, 76, American lawyer and civil rights activist.
 V. Dakshinamoorthy, 93, Indian carnatic musician and music director.
 Richard E. Dauch, 71, American automotive executive, co-founder of American Axle, cancer.
 Kurt Ehrmann, 91, German Olympic footballer.
 Ola Enstad, 70, Norwegian sculptor.
*Fernando Flávio Marques de Almeida, 97, Brazilian geologist.
Peter Goldstone, 86, British solicitor and judge.
 George Hauptfuhrer, 87, American lawyer and basketball player.
 Raymond E. Joslin, 76, American television executive (Hearst Corporation), stomach cancer.
 Alla Kushnir, 71, Russian-born Israeli chess grandmaster.
 Par Par Lay, 67, Burmese comedian and satirist, prostate cancer.
Thomas McAnea, 63,  Scottish master counterfeiter, lung cancer.
 Quincy Murphy, 60, American politician, member of the Georgia House of Representatives (since 2002), cancer.
 David Nalle, 88, American diplomat, writer and lecturer, editor of the Central Asia Monitor.
 Joe F. Smith, 94, American politician, Mayor of Charleston, West Virginia (1980–1983), member of the West Virginia House of Delegates (1997–2002).
 Barbara Trentham, 68, American actress (Rollerball), complications from leukemia.
 Pixie Williams, 85, New Zealand singer, complications from dementia, diabetes and Parkinson's disease.

3
 Yuri Brezhnev, 80, Russian Soviet politician.
 John Coombs, 91, British racing driver and team owner.
Les Cooper, 92, American doo wop musician.
 Dixie Evans, 86, American burlesque dancer, stroke.
 Jack Hightower, 86, American politician, member of the Texas House of Representatives (1953–1955), Senator (1965–1974), member of the U.S. House of Representatives from Texas (1975–1985).
 Jack Hynes, 92, Scottish-born American footballer. 
 Marina Kalashnikova, Russian historian and journalist, cancer.
 Eiichi Kawatei, 79, Japanese sports executive (ITF, ATF), led push to return tennis to Olympics in 1988, heart failure.
 Samuel Lamb, 88, Chinese Christian pastor.
Georgine Loacker, 87, American scholar.
 Rose Morat, 107, American centenarian and assault victim.
 Joy Onaolapo, 30, Nigerian champion Paralympic weightlifter (2012). (death announced on this date)
 John Palmer, 77, American journalist and news anchor (NBC News), pulmonary fibrosis.
 Duane J. Roth, 63, American pharmaceutical and technology executive, CEO of CONNECT, complications from injuries in bicycle collision.
 Dutch Savage, 78, American professional wrestler and promoter, complications from stroke. 
 Suthee Singhasaneh, 85, Thai politician, Senator and MP, Minister of Finance (1986–1988, 1991–1992).
 Ronald Siwani, 32, South African cricketer.
Donald Ungurait, 76, American acamedic.
Arline Usden, 75, British journalist.
 Iryna Zhylenko, 72, Ukrainian poet.

4
 Betty Babcock, 91, American politician, First Lady of Montana (1962–1969), member of Montana House of Representatives (1975–1977).
 Keith H. Basso, 73, American anthropologist, cancer. 
 Sherko Bekas, 73, Iraqi Kurdish poet.
 Yitzhak Berman, 100, Ukrainian-born Israeli politician, member of the Knesset (1977–1984), Speaker (1980–1981), Minister of Energy and Water Resources (1981–1982).
 John Billingham, 83, British-born American space executive (NASA), chief of life science at Ames Research Center.
 Ronny Bruckner, 56, Belgian businessman. 
 Wilf Carter, 79, English footballer (Plymouth Argyle), cancer.
 Inmaculada Cruz, 52, Spanish politician, member of the Senate (since 2011), cancer.
 Art Donovan, 89, American football player (Baltimore Colts), inducted into Pro Football Hall of Fame (1968), respiratory ailment.
 Dominick Harrod, 72, British journalist, BBC economics correspondent, complications from a fall.
 Bill Hoskyns, 82, British Olympic silver-medalist fencer (1960, 1964).
 Norris Hoyt, 76, American politician, member of the Vermont House of Representatives (1975–1983).
 Daniel Kan, 86, Dutch mathematician.
Srđan Marilović, 45,  Serbian sprint canoer.
 Olavi J. Mattila, 94, Finnish politician.
Charles Molette, 95, French Roman Catholic priest and archivist.
 David Plawecki, 65, American politician, member of the Michigan Senate (1970–1982).
 Des Raj, 69, Indian cricket umpire.
 Renato Ruggiero, 83, Italian politician, Minister of Foreign Affairs (2001–2002), Director General of World Trade Organization (1995–1999).
 Jasjit Singh, 79, Indian military officer, air commodore (Institute for Defence Studies and Analyses).
 Tony Snell, 91, British RAF fighter pilot.
 Fritz Stange, 76, German Olympic wrestler.
 Stanisław Targosz, 65, Polish military officer, commanding general of the Polish Air Force (2005–2007).
 Charles-Omer Valois, 89, Canadian Roman Catholic prelate, Bishop of Saint-Jérôme (1977–1997).
 Billy Ward, 20, Australian Olympic boxer (2012), suicide.
 Kramer Williamson, 63, American sprint car racing driver, inducted into National Sprint Car Hall of Fame (2008), race collision.
 Sir John Forster Woodward, 81, British military officer, Royal Navy admiral (Falklands War).
 Tim Wright, 63, American bass guitarist (Pere Ubu, DNA), cancer.

5
 Ruth Asawa, 87, American sculptor, natural causes.
 Malcolm Barrass, 88, English footballer (Bolton Wanderers), dementia.
 İnal Batu, 76, Turkish politician and diplomat, Ambassador to the UN and Italy, MP (1997–1999).
 Shawn Burr, 47, Canadian ice hockey player (Detroit Red Wings, San Jose Sharks), complications from a fall.
 Jaime Luiz Coelho, 97, Brazilian Roman Catholic prelate, Bishop and Archbishop of Maringá (1956–1997).
 George Duke, 67, American Grammy Award-winning jazz fusion keyboardist, chronic lymphocytic leukemia.
 Willie Dunn, 71, Canadian Mi'kmaq folk singer, film maker, songwriter and First Nations activist.
 Kenneth John Frost, 78, American astrophysicist.
 Robert Häusser, 88, German photographer.
Joseph Lehner, 100, American mathematician.
*Lin Chieh-liang, 55, Taiwanese physician and toxicologist, pneumonia and multiple organ failure.
 Hector Luisi, 94, Uruguayan politician, Foreign Minister (1967–1968), Ambassador to the United States (1985–1990).
 Qaqambile Matanzima, 63, South African tribal leader and politician, stabbed.
 Mohamed Ezzedine Mili, 95, Tunisian telecommunications engineer, Secretary General of ITU (1967–1982).
 Quraish Pur, 81, Pakistani scholar, writer and television host.
 Roy Rubin, 87, American basketball coach (Philadelphia 76ers, Long Island University).
 Frank Valdor, 75, German band leader.
 May Song Vang, 62, Laotian-born American Hmong community leader, widow of General Vang Pao, complications from cancer.
 Leonard Watson, 85, New Zealand cricketer.
 Rob Wyda, 54, American judge, commander of U.S. Navy Reserve JAG Corps, heart attack.

6

 Steve Aizlewood, 60, Welsh footballer (Newport County, Portsmouth).
 Dino Ballacci, 89, Italian football player and manager.
 Ze'ev Ben-Haim, 105, Israeli linguist.
 Marco Bucci, 52, Italian Olympic discus thrower (1984), heart attack.
 Jeremy Geidt, 83, British-born American stage actor and acting coach (Harvard University), co-founder of the American Repertory Theater, heart attack.
 John Kingsmill, 92, Australian author.
 Lidia Korsakówna, 79, Polish actress.
Luis de Jesús Lima, 68, Guatemalan radio journalist, homicide.
Martin Geoffrey Low, 63, British biologist.
 Stan Lynde, 81, American cartoonist (Rick O'Shay, Latigo), cancer.
 Earlene Roberts, 77, American politician, member of the New Mexico House of Representatives (1989–2005).
 Mava Lee Thomas, 83, American baseball player (Fort Wayne Daisies), Alzheimer's disease.
 Dave Wagstaffe, 70, English footballer (Wolverhampton Wanderers, Manchester City, Blackburn Rovers).
 Jerry Wolman, 86, American football team owner (Philadelphia Eagles, 1963–1969) and hockey team owner (Philadelphia Flyers).
 Selçuk Yula, 53, Turkish footballer, heart attack.

7
 Samuel G. Armistead, 85, American linguist.
 Zev Asher, 50, Canadian experimental musician and filmmaker, cancer.
 David Braybrooke, 88, American political philosopher, complication following cancer surgery.
Buurtpoes Bledder, 1–2, domestic cat in Netherlands, motor accident.
 Roy Davies, 79, Welsh Anglican prelate, Bishop of Llandaff (1985–1999).
 Ernest Hartmann, 79, Austrian-American psychoanalyst, heart failure.
 Thomas Fee, 82, American politician, member of the Pennsylvania House of Representatives (1970–1994).
 Almir Kayumov, 48, Russian football player and referee, suicide.
 David Leighton, 91, American Episcopalian prelate, Bishop of Maryland (1972–1985).
Hélène Loiselle, 85, Canadian actress, Alzheimer's disease.
 Elisabeth Maxwell, 92, French holocaust scholar, widow of Robert Maxwell.
 Paul Mercier, 89, Canadian politician, MP for Blainville—Deux-Montagnes (1993–1997) and Terrebonne—Blainville (1997–2000).
 Hiroshi Ogawa, 62, Japanese animator (Crayon Shin-chan, Lupin III), stomach cancer.
 Anthony Pawson, 60, Canadian genetic researcher, expert in cell communication.
 Margaret Pellegrini, 89, American actress (The Wizard of Oz), complications of a stroke.
 Sean Sasser, 44, American HIV activist, educator and reality TV personality (The Real World: San Francisco), mesothelioma.
 Pat Sheahan, 85, New Zealand Rugby Union player and publican.
 Luís Gonzaga Ferreira da Silva, 90, Portuguese-born Mozambican Roman Catholic prelate, Bishop of Lichinga (1972–2003).
 Abhay Pratap Singh, 76, Indian politician.
 Keith Skillen, 65, English footballer (Workington A.F.C.), motor neurone disease.
 William Stack, 76, British Olympic boxer.
 Vasily Tikhonov, 55, Russian ice hockey coach, fall. 
 Meeli Truu, 67, Estonian architect.
 Alexander Yagubkin, 52, Russian boxer, world amateur heavyweight champion (1982).

8

 Les Ascott, 91, Canadian football player (Toronto Argonauts).
 Chikondi Banda, 33, Malawian footballer, complications of malaria.
 Karen Black, 74, American actress (Five Easy Pieces, Nashville, Easy Rider), ampullary cancer.
 Johannes Bluyssen, 87, Dutch Roman Catholic prelate, Bishop of Den Bosch (1966–1983).
 Fernando Castro Pacheco, 95, Mexican artist and teacher.
 Jack Clement, 82, American record and film producer, songwriter and singer (Sun Records, Johnny Cash, Jerry Lee Lewis, U2), liver cancer.
 Al Coury, 78, American music executive, complications from a stroke.
 Petar Georgiev, 48, Bulgarian Olympic gymnast.
 Nicolae Gheorghe, 66, Romanian anthropologist and Roma activist, colon cancer.
 Johnny Hamilton, 78, Scottish footballer.
 Derek Hockridge, 79, British actor and translator (Asterix).
 Jiří Krejčík, 95, Czech film director (Divine Emma), screenwriter and actor (Cosy Dens).
 Igor Kurnosov, 28, Russian chess grandmaster, traffic collision.
 Jimmy McColl, 88, Scottish Olympic footballer (1948).
 Joseph M. McLaughlin, 80, American judge, member of the US District for Eastern NY (1981–1990), US Court of Appeals – Second Circuit (since 1990), pneumonia.
 Barbara Mertz, 85, American mystery writer (The Last Camel Died at Noon).
 John Rankine, 94, British science fiction author.
 Regina Resnik, 90, American operatic mezzo-soprano.
 Juana Marta Rodas, 88, Paraguayan ceramist.
 Jaymala Shiledar, 86, Indian singer and actor, multiple organ failure.
 Léon Aimé Taverdet, 90, French Roman Catholic prelate, Bishop of Langres (1981–1999).
 Ios Teper, 98, Australian Ukrainian-born Soviet military officer, awarded Order of the Red Banner for Battle of Berlin.
 James Sterling Young, 85, American historian and academic.

9
 Hezekiah Braxton, 79, American football player.
Lester Fuess Eastman, 85, American physicist, engineer and educator.
 Harry Elliott, 89, American baseball player (St. Louis Cardinals).
 Eduardo Falú, 90, Argentine guitarist and composer.
 Leo Fraser, 86, American politician, member of the New Hampshire House of Representatives (1985–1991), Senate (1991–2001), leukemia.
 Haji, 67, Canadian actress (Faster, Pussycat! Kill! Kill!).
 Glen Hobbie, 77, American baseball player (Chicago Cubs, St. Louis Cardinals).
 Ruthe Jackson, 92, American community organizer and broadcaster.
 Louisa Jo Killen, 79, British musician, folk singer (The Clancy Brothers) and songwriter, cancer.
 Johnny Logan, 86, American baseball player (Milwaukee Braves, Pittsburgh Pirates).
 William Lynch Jr., 72, American politician, complications related to kidney disease.
 Brian Moll, 88, British-born Australian actor (A Country Practice, Street Fighter).
 Ishtiaq Mubarak, 65, Malaysian Olympic hurdler (1968, 1972, 1976) and coach.
 Phill Nixon, 57, British darts player, cancer.
 John Oakley, 88, New Zealand cricketer.
 Urbano Tavares Rodrigues, 89, Portuguese academic and author.
 John H. Ross, 95, American military officer, Reconnaissance Army Air Corps pilot decorated for the Battle of the Bulge.
 Vladimir Vikulov, 67, Russian Olympic champion ice hockey player (1968, 1972).
 Anup Lal Yadav, 89, Indian politician, MP for Saharsa, Bihar MLA for Triveniganj.

10

 Batile Alake, 78, Nigerian waka singer.
 William P. Clark Jr., 81, American civil servant, National Security Advisor (1982–1983), Secretary of the Interior (1983–1985), Parkinson's disease.
 László Csatáry, 98, Hungarian police commander, convicted Nazi war criminal, pneumonia.
 Jonathan Dawson, 71, Australian film maker, critic and historian.
 Eydie Gormé, 84, American singer ("Blame It on the Bossa Nova").
 David C. Jones, 92, American USAF general, Chief of Staff of the Air Force (1974–1978), Chairman of the Joint Chiefs of Staff (1978–1982), Parkinson's disease.
 Somdet Kiaw, 85, Thai Buddhist prelate, acting Supreme Patriarch of Thailand, Abbot of Wat Saket (since 2004), blood infection.
 Calvin Ledbetter Jr., 84, American politician and academic, member of the Arkansas House of Representatives (1967–1976).
 Sir Quo-wei Lee, 95, Hong Kong banker, chairman of Hang Seng Bank Ltd., unofficial member of the Executive and Legislative Councils.
 Ahmed Mustafa, 69, Pakistani cricketer, Parkinson's disease.
 Jody Payne, 77, American musician (Willie Nelson's Family), heart failure.
 Joaquim Rufino do Rêgo, 87, Brazilian Roman Catholic prelate, Bishop of Quixadá (1971–1986) and Parnaíba (1986–2001).
 Allan Sekula, 62, American artist, cancer.
 Tan Ah Eng, 58, Malaysian politician, MP for Gelang Patah (2004–2012), brain cancer.
 Bob Thomas, 87, American politician and newspaper columnist, member of the Nevada Assembly (1982–1988).
 Amy Wallace, 58, American writer, heart condition.

11
 Comrade Alipio, Peruvian guerrilla leader.
 George Barasch, 102, American labor union leader.
 Bob Bignall, 91, Australian Olympic soccer player (1956).
 Penelope Casas, 70, American food author, pioneer of Spanish cuisine in the United States, complications from leukemia.
Charles Nelson Corey, 98, American football coach.
 Raymond Delisle, 70, French racing cyclist, suicide.
 Jean Bethke Elshtain, 72, American philosopher and academic, complications from heart failure.
 Don Friedman, 83, American politician and radio talk show host, member of the Colorado House of Representatives (1962–1976).
 Zafar Futehally, 93, Indian ornithologist and conservationist, lung failure.
 Shirley Herz, 87, American Tony Award-winning publicist (2009), complications from a stroke.
 David Howard, 76, English ballet teacher.
 Matthew Kaufman, 70, British biologist.
Claire Mackay, 82, Canadian writer, cancer.
 Paul McCarron, 79, American businessman and politician, member of the Minnesota House of Representatives.
 Francis Joseph Charles O'Reilly, 91, Irish businessman, banker and academic; Chancellor of the University of Dublin (1985–1998).
 Denis Perera, 82, Sri Lankan army general and diplomat. 
 Henry Polic II, 68, American actor (When Things Were Rotten, Webster, Batman: The Animated Series), cancer.
 Lamberto Puggelli, 75, Italian stage and opera director.
 Gianni Rocca, 84, Italian Olympic sprinter (1948).
 George Tall Chief, 96, American Sioux tribal leader, Chief of Osage Nation (1982–1990), National Native American Hall of Fame inductee.
 Judit Temes, 82, Hungarian Olympic champion swimmer (1952).
 Maung Wuntha, 68, Burmese writer and activist, cancer.

12
 Tereza de Arriaga, 98, Portuguese painter.
Lilian Bennett, 90, British businesswoman.
 Hans-Ekkehard Bob, 96, German military pilot, World War II flying ace.
 Prince Friso of Orange-Nassau, 44, Dutch royal, complications following 2012 skiing accident.
 F. Joseph Gossman, 83, American Roman Catholic prelate, Bishop of Raleigh (1975–2006).
 Jeffrey Gros, 75, American ecumenist and theologian.
 I. B. Holley Jr., 94, American military historian.
 Pauline Maier, 75, American historian and academic, lung cancer.
 David McLetchie, 61, Scottish politician, MSP for Lothian (1999–2003, since 2011) and Edinburgh Pentlands (2003–2011), cancer.
 Vasily Peskov, 83, Russian writer and journalist.
 Paul O'Neill, 84, Canadian actor, writer, historian and broadcaster (CBC).
 Ramon Pereira P., 94, Panamanian radio broadcaster.
 Robert Trotter, 83, Scottish actor (Take the High Road), director and photographer.
 Henny ter Weer, 91, Dutch Olympic fencer (1948).

13
 Anatoly Albul, 77, Russian Olympic bronze medalist wrestler (1960).
 Kris Biantoro, 75, Indonesian actor and singer, kidney disease. 
 Lothar Bisky, 71, German politician, MEP (since 2009), MP for PDS (2005–2009), Landtag of Brandenburg (1990–2005).
 Bert de Jong, 56, Dutch rally driver, cancer.
Jim Evans, 83, Australian rugby league footballer.
Gonzalo Fernández de Córdoba, 9th Duke of Arión, 79, Spanish sailor (sport).
 Tompall Glaser, 79, American country music singer.
 Damon Intrabartolo, 39, American playwright (Bare: A Pop Opera) and orchestrator (Superman Returns, In Good Company).
 Bertice Jacelon, 98, Trinidadian cricket umpire.
 Laurence Kaapama, 29, Namibian footballer (Eleven Arrows, national team). (body discovered on this date)
 Alfonso Lara, 67, Chilean footballer (Colo-Colo), cancer.
 Gonzalo Fernández de Córdoba Larios, 79, Spanish Olympic sailor.
Janusz Lewandowski, 82, Polish diplomat, cancer.
 Rui Moreira Lima, 94, Brazilian military fighter pilot.
 Jun Sadogawa, 34, Japanese manga author (Muteki Kanban Musume), suicide by hanging.
 Aaron Selber Jr., 85, American retail executive and philanthropist, heart failure.
*Alyce Spotted Bear, 67, American Three Affiliated Tribes academic, politician and civil servant, National Advisory Council on Indian Education (since 2010), liver cancer.
Earl Stevick, 89, American linguist.
 Sir Michael Stoker, 95, British physician.
 Bruno Tognaccini, 80, Italian cyclist.
 Sonatane Tuʻa Taumoepeau-Tupou, 70, Tongan politician and diplomat, Foreign Minister (2004–2009).
 Jean Vincent, 82, French football player (Lille OSC, Stade de Reims) and coach (FC Nantes, Cameroon, Tunisia).

14

 Gia Allemand, 29, American model and reality television star (The Bachelor), suicide by hanging.
 Stephen Easley, 60, American politician, member of the New Mexico House of Representatives (2013), complications from an infection.
 Vin Evans, 78, English cricketer (Durham).
 Kevin Feeney, 61, Irish judge, member of the High Court (since 2006), suspected heart attack.
*René Fernández Apaza, 89, Bolivian Roman Catholic prelate, Archbishop of Sucre (1983–1988) and Cochabamba (1988–1999).
 John Forfar, 96, British paediatrician and academic.
 Jack Garfinkel, 95, American basketball player (Boston Celtics).
 Jack Germond, 85, American journalist (Washington Star, The Baltimore Sun) and novelist, pulmonary disease.
 Dilip Singh Judeo, 64, Indian politician, MP for Bilaspur (1989–1998), Chhattisgarh MLA for Kharasia (1988–1989), kidney and lung infections.
 Sándor Keresztes, 94, Hungarian diplomat and jurist, president of the Christian Democratic People's Party (1989–1990), MP (1947–1948, 1990, 1994–1998).
 Lisa Robin Kelly, 43, American actress (That '70s Show), multiple drug intoxication.
 Allen Lanier, 67, American rock keyboardist and guitarist (Blue Öyster Cult), complications from COPD.
 Min Lu, 60, Burmese humorist, poet and writer, lung cancer.
Amer Abdel Maksoud, Egyptian professional footballer, murdered.
 Luciano Martino, 79, Italian film producer, director and screenwriter, pulmonary edema.
 Iqbal Mirchi, 63, Indian underworld figure, heart attack.
 Paddy Power, 84, Irish politician, MEP (1977–1979), TD for Kildare (1969–1989).
 Mack Rankin, 83, American oilman and Texas Rangers part-owner.
 Mark Sutton, 42, British stuntman, parachutist at 2012 Summer Olympics opening ceremony, stunt wing-diving accident.

15
 Abdul Rahman Al-Sumait, 65, Kuwaiti Islamic scholar and medical practitioner, complications of a heart condition.
 S. M. Laljan Basha, 56, Indian politician, MP for Guntur (1991–1996) and Andhra Pradesh (2002–2008), traffic collision.
 Jane Harvey, 88, American jazz singer, stomach cancer.
 Peter Huttenlocher, 82, German-born American neuroscientist, pneumonia.
 Miroslav Komárek, 89, Czech historical linguist.
 Beatrice Kozera, 92, American book character (On the Road), natural causes.
 Bert Lance, 82, American civil servant and presidential advisor, Director of the Office of Management and Budget (1977).
 William S. Livingston, 93, American academic, President of the University of Texas at Austin (1992–1993).
 Rosalía Mera, 69, Spanish textile executive (Inditex, Zara), complications from a stroke.
 Sławomir Mrożek, 83, Polish playwright.
 Selliah Ponnadurai, 78, Sri Lankan cricket umpire.
 August Schellenberg, 77, Canadian-born American actor (Free Willy, Eight Below, The New World), lung cancer.
 Marich Man Singh Shrestha, 71, Nepali politician, Prime Minister (1986–1990), lung cancer.
 Robert R. Taylor, 73, Canadian wildlife photographer, cancer.
 Jacques Vergès, 88, Thai-born French lawyer, heart attack.
 Pat Wiggins, 73, American politician, member of the California State Assembly (1998–2004) and Senate (2006–2010).

16
Ilkka Auer, 83, Finnish Olympic athlete.
 Desh Azad, 75, Indian cricketer.
 Roy Bonisteel, 83, Canadian journalist and television host, cancer.
 Chris Hallam, 49, Welsh Paralympian swimmer and wheelchair racer, cancer. 
 Kalyan Mitter, 76, Indian cricketer and coach.
 John Munro, 84, Australian cricketer and football player.
 Carlos Prada Sanmiguel, 73, Colombian Roman Catholic prelate, Bishop of Duitama–Sogamoso (1994–2012).
 David Rees, 95, British mathematician.
 John Ryden, 82, Scottish footballer (Tottenham Hotspur).
 Francesco Scaratti, 74, Italian footballer (A.S. Roma).
 Ray B. Sitton, 89, American lieutenant general, Director of the Joint Staff (1976–1977).

17
 Mayavaram Saraswathi Ammal, 91, Indian classical flautist. 
 Stephen Antonakos, 86, Greek-born American painter and sculptor.
 Bo Bing, 91, Chinese English grammar academic, respiratory failure.
*Chow Yam-nam, 76, Thai mystic, respiratory disease.
 Jim Clark, 88, Australian VFL footballer (Carlton Football Club).
 John Connelly, 85, American college baseball head coach (Northeastern University).
 Rod Craig, 55, American baseball player (Seattle Mariners), stabbed.
 Thomas Crowley, 77, American politician, member of the Vermont Senate (1967–1991), complications from hip surgery.
 Odilia Dank, 74, American politician, member of the Oklahoma House of Representatives (1994–2006), cancer.
Jan Ekström, 89, Swedish author and adman.
 Devin Gray, 41, American basketball player (Sacramento Kings, San Antonio Spurs, Houston Rockets), heart attack.
 Jack Harshman, 86, American baseball player (Chicago White Sox).
*Joseph Hoàng Văn Tiệm, 74, Vietnamese Roman Catholic prelate, Bishop of Bui Chu (since 2001).
 John Hollander, 83, American poet, pulmonary congestion.
 Claus Jacobi, 86, German journalist, editor-in-chief of Der Spiegel (1962–1968).
 David Landes, 89, American academic.
 Kjell Lund, 86, Norwegian architect, songwriter and singer.
 Frank Martínez, 89, American artist, complications from diabetes and renal disease. 
 Benjamin Mwila, 70, Zambian politician, Minister of Defence (1991–1997), MP for Luanshya, complications of malaria.
*Thomas Nguyễn Văn Tân, 72, Vietnamese Roman Catholic prelate, Bishop of Vĩnh Long (since 2001).
 Noel Pidding, 86, Australian rugby league player (St George Dragons).
 Wallace H. Robinson, 93, American Marine Corps general.
 Fernando Urdapilleta, 89, Argentine Olympic equestrian.
 Gus Winckel, 100, Dutch military pilot.

18
 Christopher Barton, 85, British Olympic rower (1948).
Bill Bond, 71, American tennis player.
 Florin Cioabă, 58, Romanian Romani Pentecostal minister, cardiac arrest.
Robert Curtis (American football), 78,  American football coach.
 Wes Dakus, 75, Canadian rockabilly musician. 
 Josephine D'Angelo, 88, American baseball player (South Bend Blue Sox).
 Keith Dollery, 88, Australian cricketer.
 Victoria Eugenia Fernández de Córdoba, 96, Spanish noble, Duchess of Medinaceli (since 1956).
 Dezső Gyarmati, 85, Hungarian Olympic water polo champion (1952, 1956, 1964), silver medalist (1948), bronze medalist (1960) and coach.
 Jean Kahn, 84, French Jewish community leader and human rights activist.
Alberto Marsicano, 61, Brazilian musician, translator, writer, philosopher and professor.
 Edith Master, 80, American Olympic equestrian (1976).
 Eyob Mekonnen, 37, Ethiopian reggae singer, complications from a stroke.
 Tjostolv Moland, 32, Norwegian Army officer and private security contractor, suicide by hanging.
 José Luis Montes, 57, Spanish football player and coach.
 Albert Murray, 97, American literary and jazz critic, biographer and novelist.
 Elaine Sortino, 64, American softball coach (University of Massachusetts), cancer.
 Rolv Wesenlund, 76, Norwegian actor and comedian.

19
 Musa'id bin Abdulaziz Al Saud, 89–90, Saudi Arabian prince, second-oldest surviving son of King Abdulaziz.
 Abdur Rahman Boyati, 74, Bangladeshi folk singer.
 Pat Delaney, 69, Irish hurler (Kilkenny GAA).
 Russell Doughten, 86, American film producer (A Thief in the Night), renal failure. 
 Reha Eken, 88, Turkish footballer.
 Abdelrahman El-Trabely, 23, Egyptian Olympic wrestler (2012), shot.
 Abdul Rahim Hatef, 88, Afghan politician, President (1992).
 Donna Hightower, 86, American singer. 
 Hoàng Cầm, 93, Vietnamese military officer, Senior Lieutenant General (1984–1992), recipient of the Medal of Ho Chi Minh.
 Mike Tichafa Karakadzai, 56, Zimbabwean military officer and politician, car accident.
 Mirko Kovač, 74, Montenegrin writer.
 Wacław Kuźmicki, 92, Polish Olympic decathlete (1948).
 William McDermott, 83, Irish-born Peruvian Roman Catholic prelate, Bishop of Huancavélica (1982–2005).
R. S. McGregor, 83–84, New Zealand philologist.
 Stephenie McMillan, 71, British set decorator (The English Patient, Chocolat, Harry Potter), Oscar winner (1997), ovarian cancer.
 Matti Murto, 64, Finnish Olympic ice hockey player (1972, 1976), esophageal cancer.
 Sid Parnes, 91, American academic. 
 Fritz Rau, 83, German music promoter.
 José Sarria, 90, American LGBT rights activist and drag queen, founder of the Imperial Court System.
 Kenneth N. Stevens, 89, American computer scientist.
 Olev Subbi, 83, Estonian artist.
 Dagon Taya, 95, Burmese author and peace activist.
 Cedar Walton, 79, American jazz pianist.
 Lee Thompson Young, 29, American actor (The Famous Jett Jackson, Friday Night Lights, Rizzoli & Isles), suicide by gunshot.

20
 Sathima Bea Benjamin, 76, South African jazz singer, wife of Abdullah Ibrahim.
Alan Bluechel, 88, American politician.
 Jim Brothers, 72, American sculptor, cancer.
 Narendra Dabholkar, 67, Indian social activist, shot.
 Don Hassler, 84, American jazz musician and businessman.
 Wayne Hodgson, 54, New Zealand cricketer.
 Mahmoud Hweimel, Jordanian politician, Member of the House of Representatives, cancer.
 Leslie Jaeger, 87, British–born Canadian civil engineer and academic.
 Bishun Khare, 80, Indian scientist (SETI Institute).
Lando, 23, German Thoroughbred racehorse and sire, euthanized.
 Ernest-Marie Laperrousaz, 89, French historian and archaeologist.
 Elmore Leonard, 87, American author (Get Shorty, Three-Ten to Yuma, Out of Sight), complications from a stroke.
 Jimmy Mankins, 87, American politician, member of the Texas House of Representatives (1975–1983).
 Marian McPartland, 95, British jazz pianist, writer, composer, and radio host (Piano Jazz).
 John W. Morris, 91, American army lieutenant general, Chief of Engineers (1976—1980).
 Mun Kyong-jin, North Korean head of the Unhasu Orchestra, executed by firing squad.
 Ewa Petelska, 92, Polish film director (Copernicus) and screenwriter.
 Charles Pollock, 83, American furniture designer, fire.
 Ted Post, 95, American director (Hang 'Em High, Magnum Force, Beneath the Planet of the Apes).
 Jayant Salgaonkar, 84, Indian historian, academic and astrologer, founder of Kalnirnay almanac.
 Costică Ștefănescu, 62, Romanian footballer (UEFA Euro 1984), suicide by self-defenestration.

21
Abdul Razzaq Baloch, 35–42, Pakistani journalist, strangulation (body found on this date).
 Jean Berkey, 74, American politician, member of the Washington House of Representatives (2000–2004) and Senate (2004–2010).
 Sid Bernstein, 95, American music producer and promoter, brought The Beatles and The Rolling Stones to the United States.
 Wellington Burtnett, 82, American Olympic silver medallist ice hockey player (1956).
 Rodolfo Tan Cardoso, 75, Filipino chess player, heart attack.
 Malathi Chendur, 84, Indian Telugu writer, novelist and columnist.
 C. Gordon Fullerton, 76, American astronaut and test pilot (ALT program, STS-3, STS-51-F), complications from a stroke.
 David Gilhooly, 70, American ceramicist and printmaker, cancer. 
Kemaluddin Hossain, 90, Bangladeshi jurist.
 Huw Jenkins, 68, Welsh cricket player (Glamorgan). 
Elwyn John, 77, Welsh priest.
 Matti Kasvio, 69, Finnish Olympic swimmer.
 Ulvis Katlaps, 45, Latvian ice hockey player, stomach cancer.
 Fred Martin, 84, Scottish footballer (Aberdeen).
 Enos Nkala, 81, Zimbabwean politician, Minister of Finance (1980–1983), Minister of Defense (1985–1988), multiple organ failure.
 Lew Wood, 84, American television journalist (The Today Show, CBS News), kidney failure.

22
 Robert M. Bowman, 78, American air force officer.
 Keiko Fuji, 62, Japanese singer and actress, fall.
 Jørgen Hammergaard Hansen, 83, Danish badminton player.
 Sir Geoffrey Inkin, 78, British soldier and public servant.
 Petr Kment, 71, Czech Olympic bronze-medalist Greco-Roman wrestler (1968).
 William McIlroy, 85, British secularist and atheist activist.
 Ronald Motley, 68, American lawyer, led efforts against tobacco companies, complications of organ failure.
 Jetty Paerl, 92, Dutch singer ("De vogels van Holland").
 Paul Poberezny, 91, American aviation pioneer, aircraft designer and founder of the Experimental Aircraft Association, cancer.
 Jim Ramsay, 83, Australian politician, Member of the Victorian Legislative Assembly for Balwyn (1973–1988).
 Andrea Servi, 29, Italian footballer, lung cancer.
 Peter Waieng, 47, Papua New Guinean politician, Minister of Defence, stabbed.

23
 Alan Brown, 80, English cricketer (Northumberland).
 Red Burns, 88, Canadian academic.
 Richard J. Corman, 58, American railroad executive, owner and founder of R.J. Corman Railroad Group, multiple myeloma.
 Stephen Crohn, 66, American medical research subject (HIV), suicide.
 David Garrick, 67, English singer.
 William Glasser, 88, American psychiatrist and developer of reality therapy, respiratory failure from pneumonia.
Tonnie Hom, 80, Dutch swimmer.
 Charles Lisanby, 89, American production designer, complications from a fall.
 Henry Maxwell, 81, New Zealand rugby league player (Point Chevalier Pirates).
 Dean Meminger, 65, American basketball player (New York Knicks, Atlanta Hawks).
 Konstanty Miodowicz, 62, Polish politician, member of the Sejm (since 1997), complications from neurosurgery.
 Peter Needham, 81, South African cricketer.
 Vesna Rožič, 26, Slovene chess player, peritoneal cancer.
 Irwin Russell, 87, American entertainment lawyer (Michael Eisner, Jim Henson, Dr. Seuss), complications from leukemia.
 Nasser Sharify, 87, Iranian academic and librarian.
 Gilbert Taylor, 99, British cinematographer (Star Wars, The Omen, Dr. Strangelove).
 Javanshir Vakilov, 62, Azerbaijani diplomat and academic.
 David Watkins, 87, British politician, MP for Consett (1966–1983).
 Vadim Yusov, 84, Russian cinematographer (Ivan's Childhood, Andrei Rublev, Solaris).
 Tatyana Zaslavskaya, 85, Russian economic sociologist.

24
 Gerry Baker, 75, Scottish-American soccer player (Ipswich Town, Manchester City).
Sonia Coutinho, 74,  Brazilian journalist, short story writer and novelist, heart attack.
 Ricardo Elizondo Elizondo, 63, Mexican writer, cancer.
 Julie Harris, 87, American Tony Award-winning actress (The Belle of Amherst, East of Eden, Knots Landing), heart failure.
 Alf Kaartvedt, 92, Norwegian historian.
Julio Marigil, 77, Spanish footballer.
 Muriel Siebert, 84, American financial executive and philanthropist; first woman member of the New York Stock Exchange, cancer.
 Newton de Sordi, 82, Brazilian World Cup champion footballer (1958), multiple organ dysfunction syndrome.
 Filippo Strofaldi, 73, Italian Roman Catholic prelate, Bishop of Ischia (1997–2012).
 P. W. Vidanagamage, 79, Sri Lankan cricket umpire.
 Mike Winters, 82, British comedian.
 José Zárate, 63, Colombian footballer.

25
 Ciril Bergles, 79, Slovene poet, essayist and translator.
 António Borges, 63, Portuguese economist and banker, pancreatic cancer.
 Robert J. Corts, 96, American politician and judge.
 Domenico Crusco, 79, Italian Roman Catholic prelate, Bishop of Oppido Mamertina-Palmi (1991–1999) and San Marco Argentano-Scalea (1999–2011).
 William Froug, 91, American television writer and producer (Bewitched, The Twilight Zone, Gilligan's Island).
 Akio Hattori, 84, Japanese mathematician. 
 Bobby Hoff, 73, American poker player.
 Frederick Wilfrid Lancaster, 80, British-born American information scientist.
 Liu Fuzhi, 96, Chinese politician, Procurator-General of the Supreme People's Procuratorate (1988–1993).
 Bill Nilsson, 80, Swedish motocross racer.
 Rajko Pavlovec, 81, Slovenian geologist.
 Raghunath Panigrahi, 79, Indian classical singer and music director.
*Abdul Samad Abdulla, 67, Maldivian politician, Foreign Minister (since 2012), kidney failure.
 Gylmar dos Santos Neves, 83, Brazilian World Cup champion footballer (1958, 1962), stroke.
 Karl-Wilhelm Welwei, 82, German historian.

26
John Dawe, 85, Australian Olympic sailor.
*Hélie de Saint Marc, 91, French Resistance member and military officer, participant in 1961 Generals' Putsch.
 John J. Gilligan, 92, American politician, member of the United States House of Representatives for Ohio (1965–1967), Governor of Ohio (1971–1975), heart failure.
 Kauko Hänninen, 83, Finnish Olympic bronze medallist rower (1956, 1960, 1964, 1968).
 Henny Knoet, 71, Dutch designer (Efteling), cancer.
 Luigi Lucchini, 94, Italian steel executive, President of Confindustria (1984–1988).
 Gerard Murphy, 64, British actor (Batman Begins, Doctor Who, Waterworld), prostate cancer.
 Bill Schmitz, 59, American football coach, United States Coast Guard Academy (1993–1996), Austin Peay University (1997–2002), suicide by jumping.
 Jack Sinagra, 63, American politician, member of the New Jersey Senate (1992–2002), Mayor of East Brunswick, New Jersey (1989–1991).
 Sybille Verckist, 78, Belgian Olympic swimmer.
 Clyde A. Wheeler, 92, American politician and lobbyist.
 George Whittaker, 93, Canadian politician.

27
 David Barker, 75, English physician and epidemiologist.
 Zelmo Beaty, 73, American basketball player (St. Louis Hawks, Utah Stars).
 Helene Brandt, 77, American sculptor.
 Chen Liting, 103, Chinese playwright and film director. 
 Kent Finell, 69, Swedish radio host (Svensktoppen).
 Max Fuller, 68, Australian chess master.
 Carl Graffunder, 94, American modernist architect.
 Magnhild Holmberg, 70, Norwegian politician.
 Jean Jansem, 93, Turkish-born French painter of Armenian themes.
 Chris Kennedy, 64, Australian film director (Doing Time for Patsy Cline, A Man's Gotta Do), heart attack.
 Zoltán Kovács, 26, Hungarian footballer.
 Anatoly Onoprienko, 54, Ukrainian serial killer and mass murderer, heart failure.
 Bill Peach, 78, Australian journalist and television presenter, cancer.
 Henry Rebello, 84, Indian Olympic triple jumper (1948) and sport administrator.
 Héctor Sanabria, 27, Argentinian footballer (Deportivo Laferrere), heart attack.
 Lucy Smith, 78, Norwegian academic, Rector of the University of Oslo (1993–1998), cancer.
David Stenhouse, 81, English biologist.
 Dave Thomas, 79, Welsh international golfer and golf course designer.

28
 Bernard Becker, 93, American ophthalmologist and glaucoma researcher (Washington University School of Medicine), lung cancer.
 Lorella Cedroni, 52, Italian political philosopher.
 John Bellany, 71, Scottish painter.
 Matt Doust, 29, American-born Australian artist, epileptic seizure.
 Edmund Fitzgerald, 87, American businessman.
 Murray Gershenz, 91, American actor (The Hangover, I Love You, Man, The Incredible Burt Wonderstone) and entrepreneur, heart attack.
 Ray Grebey, 85, American labor negotiator for Major League Baseball.
 Gus, 27, American polar bear, euthanized. (death announced on this date)
 László Gyetvai, 94, Hungarian footballer (Ferencváros, national team).
Ajay Jha, 57, Indian first-class cricketer, heart attack.
 Francis Kajiya, 59, Zambian footballer.
Diarmuid Ó Gráinne, 63, Irish writer and journalist.
 Larry Pennell, 85, American actor (Ripcord, The Great White Hope, Bubba Ho-Tep).
 Frank Pulli, 78, American baseball umpire, complications from Parkinson's disease.
 Brian Smith, 57, English footballer (Bolton Wanderers).
 Barry Stobart, 75, English footballer (Wolverhampton Wanderers).
 Aajonus Vonderplanitz, 66, American food activist, fall.
 Rafael Díaz Ycaza, 87, Ecuadorian writer.

29
 Jack Beal, 82, American realist painter.
 Artan Bushati, 49, Albanian football manager.
Bob Green, 87,  Australian naturalist, photographer and conservationist.
 Peter Grzybowski, 59, Polish artist.
 Joan L. Krajewski, 79, American politician, Member of the Philadelphia City Council (1980–2012), complications from COPD.
 Robert MacEwen, 85, Scottish rugby player.
 Darren Manzella, 36, American gay rights activist, traffic collision.
Cliff Mason, 83, English professional footballer.
 Medardo Joseph Mazombwe, 81, Zambian Roman Catholic prelate, Bishop of Chipata (1970–1996) and Cardinal Archbishop of Lusaka (1996–2006), cancer.
 Cliff Morgan, 83, Welsh rugby player and broadcaster.
 Bruce C. Murray, 81, American space scientist, Director of the Jet Propulsion Laboratory (1976–1982), complications from Alzheimer's disease.
Fernando Solijon, 47, Filipino radio journalist, shot.
 Steven Tari, 41–42, Papua New Guinean cult leader, slashed.
 Are Vesterlid, 92, Norwegian architect.

30
 Alfredo Betancourt, 98, Salvadoran writer.
 William C. Campbell, 90, American golfer, U.S. Amateur champion (1964), President of the United States Golf Association (1982–1983).
 Howie Crittenden, 80, American basketball player (Murray State University).
Eva J. Engel, 94, German-Jewish scholar.
 Allan Gotthelf, 70, American philosopher, cancer.
 Seamus Heaney, 74, Irish poet, Nobel Prize laureate (1995).
Geresom Ilukor, 77–78, Ugandan bishop.
 Romana Kryzanowska, 90, American Pilates instructor and author.
 Leo Lewis, 80, American football player (Lincoln Blue Tigers, Winnipeg Blue Bombers).
 John "Juke" Logan, 66, American blues harmonica player, complications from esophageal cancer. 
 Lotfi Mansouri, 84, Iranian opera director (Canadian Opera Company, San Francisco Opera).
 Glenn Terrell, 93, American academic, President of Washington State University (1967–1985).
Tokai Teio, 25, Japanese thoroughbred racehorse, heart attack.

31
 Jean-Louis Beaumont, 87, French politician, Deputy (1978–1981, 1993–1997), mayor of Saint-Maur-des-Fossés (1977–2008).
 William John Brennan, 75, Australian Roman Catholic prelate, Bishop of Wagga Wagga (1984–2002).
 Peter Calder, 87, British mechanical engineer.
 Alan Carrington, 79, British chemist.
 Sir David Frost, 74, British broadcaster (That Was the Week That Was, The Frost Report, The Nixon Interviews), heart attack.
 Jimmy Greenhalgh, 90, British football player and manager (Darlington F.C.).
Robert Lebron, 85, American impressionist artist.
 LeRoy Martin, 84, American police officer, Chicago Police Department superintendent (1987–1992).
Samuel Rovinski, 81–82, Costa Rican author of plays, novels, short stories and essays.
 Donald W. Steinmetz, 88, American judge.
 Jan Camiel Willems, 73, Belgian mathematician.

References

2013-08
 08